Taco Mac is a chain of sports bars based in Atlanta, Georgia. It was founded in 1979 by Greg Wakeham and others, with the chain's original location being in Atlanta's Virginia Highlands neighborhood; this location is still open as of 2023.  In 2000, Bob Campbell, Joe Ardagna, and Greg Wakeham established Tappan Street Restaurant Group, who expanded the chain to 25 locations in 3 states.   In late 2014, Tappan Street was sold to the Dallas, Texas-based private equity firm CIC Partners. In March 2018, CIC Partners sold Taco Mac to the investor group Fresh Hospitality, whose CEO, Harold Martin Jr., then became the chain's CEO.

References

External links

Restaurants established in 1979
Restaurant chains in the United States
1979 establishments in Georgia (U.S. state)
Restaurants in Atlanta